Wehr may refer to:

 WEHR, a former radio station owned by Penn State University
 Wehr, Baden-Württemberg, Germany
 Wehr, Rhineland-Palatinate, Germany
 Wehr, a village in Selfkant, North Rhine-Westphalia, Germany

People with the surname
Dick Wehr (1925–2011), American professional basketball player
Hans Wehr (1909–1981), German Arabist
Julian Wehr (1898–1970), American author of children's books
Todd Wehr (1889–1965), American industrialist and philanthropist
Wesley Wehr (1929–2004), American palaeontologist
Thomas Wehr, American psychiatrist

See also
Ver (disambiguation)
Vera (disambiguation)
Vere (disambiguation)
Verus (disambiguation)
WER (disambiguation)